Krefeld-Linn station is a regional station in the district of Linn in the city of Krefeld in the German state of North Rhine-Westphalia. It lies on the Osterath–Essen railway; the Rhenish Railway Company (Rheinische Eisenbahn-Gesellschaft) gained a concession to build the line on 16 July 1863. The line was opened on 1 September 1866, with the stations not yet finished. Linn station was opened on 15 October 1874 and the first entrance building was also put into operation at this time. The station name was changed to Crefeld-Linn in 1905 and Krefeld-Linn in 1925. This name still applies today.

A new entrance building opened in Linn in 1907, which is still preserved (the old one was demolished in 1912). It has not been used for more than 20 years and is in a stage of advanced decay.

Rail services

The station is on the Duisburg–Mönchengladbach railway and is only served by regional services.

Tram service

A tram line stops at Krefeld-Linn station. It is operated by SWK Mobil.

Bus routes

The following bus routes stop at Krefeld-Linn station. They are operated by SWK Mobil.

References

Railway stations in North Rhine-Westphalia
Railway stations in Germany opened in 1874
Buildings and structures in Krefeld